Bibio anglicus is a species of fly from the family Bibionidae.

References

Bibionidae
Insects described in 1869
Nematoceran flies of Europe